Rolf Søder (4 July 1918 – 23 August 1998) was a Norwegian film actor. He appeared in 40 films between 1955 and 1991.

Filmography

References

External links

1918 births
1998 deaths
Norwegian male film actors
Male actors from Oslo
Norwegian male stage actors
20th-century Norwegian male actors